Bolshaya Amzya (Olo Ämzä) is a rural locality (a village) in Razdolyevsky Selsoviet, Krasnokamsky District, Bashkortostan, Russia. The population was 141 as of 2010. There are 3 streets.

Geography 
Bolshaya Amzya is located 21 km east of Nikolo-Beryozovka (the district's administrative centre) by road. Razdolye is the nearest rural locality.

References 

Rural localities in Krasnokamsky District